R with stroke (majuscule: Ɍ, minuscule: ɍ) is a letter of the Latin alphabet, derived from R with the addition of a bar through the letter.

Usage
It is used in the Kanuri language and in Tunisian Arabic transliteration (based on Maltese with additional letters). It was also used in the Unified Northern Alphabet.

Code positions

Latin letters with diacritics